Letizia Ciampa (born 20 August 1986) is an Italian voice actress.

Biography
Letizia is the recurring voice of many famous actresses such as Emma Watson, Emilia Clarke, Lucy Hale, Lily James, Kaya Scodelario, Anya Taylor-Joy, Mia Wasikowska, Hailee Steinfeld, Anna Popplewell, Alexa Vega and many others.

Letizia began her career when she was a child, working in studios such as Digidub, La BiBi.it, CD Cine Dubbing, Cast Dubggio, CVD, Royfilm, CDC Sefit Group, Pumaisdue and Dubbing Brothers International Italia. She voiced Alexa Vega as Carmen Cortez in the Spy Kids franchise, Ashley Olsen  in Two of a Kind, Joy Lauren in Desperate Housewives and Kelly Osbourne in Life as We Know It; and her Italian voice of the character of Daenerys Targaryen, played by Emilia Clarke, in the television series Game of Thrones.

In the world of animation, Ciampa is best known as the voice of Bloom in Winx Club, Anya Alstreim in Code Geass: Lelouch of the Rebellion, Chibiusa in the Shin Vision version of the anime movie Sailor Moon R: The Movie and Mimi Tasogare in Duel Masters.

Filmography

Film

Television

Dubbing roles

Animation
 Bloom in Winx Club
 Bloom in Winx Club: The Secret of the Lost Kingdom
 Bloom in Winx Club 3D: Magical Adventure
 Sadie in Total Drama
 Jenny in Monster House
 Mystique Sonia in Hero: 108
 Princess Pea in The Tale of Despereaux
 Alana in The Little Mermaid 3
 Ruffnut Thorston in How to Train Your Dragon
 Mimi Tasogare in Duel Masters
 Hotaru Imai in Gakuen Alice
 Sayu Yagami in Death Note
 Theresa in Class of the Titans
 Alya Césaire in Miraculous: Tales of Ladybug & Cat Noir
 Young Wendy in Return to Neverland
Tille McNally in ChalkZone

Live action
 Hermione Granger in Harry Potter and the Philosopher's Stone
 Hermione Granger in Harry Potter and the Chamber of Secrets
 Hermione Granger in Harry Potter and the Prisoner of Azkaban
 Hermione Granger in Harry Potter and the Goblet of Fire
 Hermione Granger in Harry Potter and the Order of the Phoenix
 Hermione Granger in Harry Potter and the Half-Blood Prince
 Hermione Granger in Harry Potter and the Deathly Hallows – Part 1
 Hermione Granger in Harry Potter and the Deathly Hallows – Part 2
Carmen Cortez in Spy Kids
Carmen Cortez in Spy Kids 2: The Island of Lost Dreams
Carmen Cortez in Spy Kids 3-D: Game Over
Carmen Cortez in Spy Kids: All the Time in the World
Gabriella Montez in High School Musical
Gabriella Montez in High School Musical 2
Gabriella Montez in High School Musical 3: Senior Year
 Tin-Tin Kyrano in Thunderbirds
 Leslie Burke in Bridge to Terabithia
 Alice Kingsleigh in Alice in Wonderland
 Taylor Fry in Mortified
 Ashley Burke in Two of a Kind
 Stevie Lake in The Saddle Club
 Daenerys Targaryen in Game of Thrones

References

External links
 Dubbing roles Letizia Ciampa's dubbing contributions 
 
 
 

1986 births
Living people
Actresses from Rome
Italian child actresses
Italian film actresses
Italian television actresses
Italian voice actresses